Thryptomene striata is a shrub species in the family Myrtaceae that is endemic to Western Australia.

It blooms in September producing pink-purple flowers.

It is found in the Mid West region of Western Australia between Geraldton and Northampton where it grows in sandy to loamy soils with ironstone.

References

striata
Endemic flora of Western Australia
Rosids of Western Australia
Vulnerable flora of Australia
Plants described in 2001
Taxa named by Barbara Lynette Rye
Taxa named by Malcolm Eric Trudgen